= Steve Yetiv =

American political scientist and professor (1964–2018)

Steve A. Yetiv (March 31, 1964 – March 21, 2018) was an American political scientist and University Professor of Political Science and International Studies at Old Dominion University. Yetiv authored numerous books on American foreign policy, decision making, and energy security.

Yetiv died in Norfolk, Virginia on March 21, 2018.

== Books ==
- "America and the Persian Gulf: The Third Party Dimension in World Politics" (Praeger, 1995)
- "The Persian Gulf Crisis" (Greenwood, 1997), in 1358 libraries according to Worldcat
- "Crude Awakenings: Global Oil Security and American Foreign Policy" (Cornell University Press, 2004)
- "Explaining Foreign Policy: U.S. Decision-Making & the Persian Gulf War" (Johns Hopkins University Press, 2004 & 2011)
- "The Absence of Grand Strategy: The United States in the Persian Gulf, 1972-2005" (Johns Hopkins University Press, 2008)
- "The Petroleum Triangle: Oil, Globalization, and Terror" (Johns Hopkins University Press, 2011)
- “Challenged Hegemony: The United States, China, and Russia in the Persian Gulf” (Stanford University Press, 2018)

== Resources ==
- "Steve Yetiv", Special Collections and University Archives Wiki, Old Dominion University Libraries.
